The Sorrento Stakes is a Grade II American Thoroughbred horse race for two-year-old fillies over a distance of six furlongs on the dirt track scheduled annually in August at Del Mar Racetrack in Del Mar, California. The event currently carries a purse of $200,000.

History

The event was inaugurated on 7 October 1967 during the then Del Mar Fall meeting and was run over a distance of  furlongs on the turf course. It was won by Windsor Honey who was ridden by US Hall of Fame jockey Johnny Sellers with a time of 1:30. The event was idle for two years, and when it resumed the event was scheduled early in the summer meeting in 1970 and needed to be split into two divisions at a distance of six furlongs.

The event has had several changes in distance but returned to the six furlong sprint in 2018.

In 1986 the event was classified as Grade III and was upgraded to Grade II in 1994. However, the event was downgraded back to Grade III in 2004 before being upgraded once more in 2015.

The event's position in the racing calendar at Del Mar has led to the race being a preparatory race for the Del Mar Debutante Stakes which is usually scheduled for several weeks later.

The race has produced some prodigious young fillies who have gone on to capture Juvenile honors and even progress as older fillies and mares.
Notable winners of this event include the 1971 winner, Windy's Daughter, whose win in the race was part of an undefeated seven-race season. The following year the filly was crowned the first California-bred Horse of the Year. The 1986 winner Brave Raj not only captured the Sorrento Stakes–Del Mar Debutante Stakes double, but also went on to win the Breeders' Cup Juvenile Fillies becoming the 
richest two-year-old filly in history winning $911,150 during the season. The filly Silverbulletday won this event in 1998. Later that year she would also win the Breeders' Cup Juvenile Fillies and be crowned the US Champion Two-Year-Old Filly. The 2001 winner Tempera easily won as the odds-on favorite by nine lengths, the largest victory length in the event and also went on to win the Breeders' Cup Juvenile Fillies and be crowned the US Champion Two-Year-Old Filly. The last filly to win the Sorrento Stakes and also the Breeders' Cup Juvenile Fillies was Champagne Room in 2016.

Records
Speed records: 
6 furlongs – 1:09.00  Windy's Daughter (1972)
 furlongs: 1:15.60 – Batroyale (1995)
7 furlongs: 1:22.00 – 	Lite Light (1990)
1 mile: 1:35.80  – Hazel R. (1979)

Margins:
9 lengths – Tempera (2001)

Most wins by a jockey:
 6 – Laffit Pincay Jr. (1976, 1980, 1987, 1989, 1993, 2000)
 5 – Bill Shoemaker (1972, 1977, 1981, 1982, 1984)
 5 – David Flores (1999, 2001, 2003, 2004, 2007)

Most wins by a trainer:
 7 – Bob Baffert (1991, 1995, 1998, 1999, 2004, 2012, 2015)

Most wins by an owner:
 3 – Elmendorf (1974, 1975, 1978)

 Sorrento Stakes – Del Mar Debutante Stakes double
 Windy's Daughter (1972), Fleet Peach (1973), Queen to Be (1975), Telferner (1976), Arewehavingfunyet (1985), Brave Raj (1986), Batroyale (1995), Chilukki (1999), Mi Sueno (2009), Executiveprivilege (2012), Bellafina (2018)

Winners

Legend:

 
 
 

Notes:

§ Ran as part of an entry

See also
 List of American and Canadian Graded races

External links
 2020 Del Mar Media Guide

References

Del Mar Racetrack
Horse races in California
Flat horse races for two-year-old fillies
Graded stakes races in the United States
1967 establishments in California
Recurring sporting events established in 1967
Grade 2 stakes races in the United States